Podstene may refer to:

Slovenia
Podstene, Kočevje, a settlement in the Municipality of Kočevje
Podstene pri Kostelu, a settlement in the Municipality of Kostel